Nārāyaṇa Paṇḍita (1340–1400) was an Indian mathematician. Plofker writes that his texts were the most significant Sanskrit mathematics treatises after those of Bhaskara II, other than the Kerala school. He wrote the Ganita Kaumudi (lit "Moonlight of mathematics") in 1356 about mathematical operations. The work anticipated many developments in combinatorics. About his life, the most that is known is that:

Narayana Pandit wrote two works, an arithmetical treatise called Ganita Kaumudi and an algebraic treatise called Bijaganita Vatamsa. Narayanan is also thought to be the author of an elaborate commentary of Bhaskara II's Lilavati, titled Karmapradipika (or Karma-Paddhati). Although the Karmapradipika contains little original work, it contains seven different methods for squaring numbers, a contribution that is wholly original to the author, as well as contributions to algebra and magic squares.

Narayana's other major works contain a variety of mathematical developments, including a rule to calculate approximate values of square roots, investigations into the second order indeterminate equation nq2 + 1 = p2 (Pell's equation), solutions of indeterminate higher-order equations, mathematical operations with zero, several geometrical rules, methods of integer factorization, and a discussion of magic squares and similar figures. Evidence also exists that Narayana made minor contributions to the ideas of differential calculus found in Bhaskara II's work. Narayana has also made contributions to the topic of cyclic quadrilaterals.
Narayana is also credited with developing a method for systematic generation of all permutations of a given sequence.

Narayana's cows is an integer sequence which Narayana described as the number of cows present each year, starting from one cow in the first year, where every cow has one baby cow each year starting in its fourth year of life. The first few terms of the sequence are as follows: 1, 1, 1, 2, 3, 4, 6, 9, 13, 19, … Narayana's cows is sequence  in OEIS. The ratio of consecutive terms approaches the supergolden ratio.

References

1340 births
1400 deaths
Indian Hindus
14th-century Indian mathematicians